Gandugali is a 1994 Indian Kannada-language action film directed by C. H. Balaji Singh Babu and written, co-produced by J.G. Krishna. The film stars Shiva Rajkumar and Nirosha. The film's successful soundtrack and score is composed by Sadhu Kokila.

Plot

Cast 
 Shiva Rajkumar as Mahesh 
 Nirosha 
 Pournami
 Rajeev as kailash 
 Ravikiran as Narendra 
 Meghana 
Stunt Devu 
Rocket Vikram 
Sathyajith 
Narasimha moorthi 
Madhu bangaarappa 
Manjunath Hegde 
Guru kiran 
Bank Suresh 
Prithviraj 
Papamma
Agro Chikkanna 

King Kong 
 Bank Janardhan
 Sihi Kahi Chandru
 Disco Shanti
Raju sundaram
 Jai Jagadish...guest appearance

Soundtrack 
The soundtrack of the film was composed by Sadhu Kokila. The song "Ee Jodi Nodi" is inspired from the song "Amma Dekh Tera Munda" from 1994 Hindi movie Stuntman.

References

External links 

 Songs at raaga

1994 films
1990s Kannada-language films
1990s action drama films
Indian action drama films
1994 drama films